The men's K-2 1000 metres event was a pairs kayaking event conducted as part of the Canoeing at the 1964 Summer Olympics programme on Lake Sagami, Japan.

The preliminary heats were held on 20 October 1964; 16 pairs entered and were split into two heats of 8 each.  The top three placers in each heat advanced to the semifinal, while the remaining eight crews (2 had withdrawn without starting in the heats) had to compete in repechage heats held the same day.  There were two repechage heats and three kayakers to advance from each, resulting in two pairs being eliminated in the repechages.  Three semifinals, each with four kayakers, were held, with the top three in each heat to advance to the final and three more pairs eliminated. The final was held on 22 October.

Medalists

Results

Heats

The 16 crews first raced in two heats on 20 October.  The top three finishers from each of the heats advanced directly to the semifinals; two were eliminated due to not starting, and the remaining 8 teams were relegated to the repechage heats.

Repechages

Three of the four competitors in each of the two repechages advanced to the semifinals.

Semifinals

The top three finishers in each of the three semifinals (raced on 21 October) advanced to the final.  All other teams were eliminated.

Final

The final was held on 22 October.

References
1964 Summer Olympics official report Volume 2, Part 1. p. 247.
Sports-reference.com 1964 K-2 1000 m results.

Men's K-2 1000
Men's events at the 1964 Summer Olympics